Phrynus longipes is a species of amblypygid (whip spider) often found in the Caribbean. They are also found in other warm climate areas such as the forests of Central America. Within this region, however, Phrynus longipes lives in an array of habitats from caves to coastlines. They are protective of their territory, using their pedipalps to deter predators or unwanted visitors. Being nocturnal predators, they take shelter during the day and hunt primarily at night. Phrynus longipes feed on both vertebrates and invertebrates. They are the first amblypygid to be recorded feeding on an avian species.

Description 
The body of Phrynus longipes rarely exceeds three quarters of an inch. The front legs have been recorded at sizes of almost ten inches long. They have two sets of four legs – like almost all arachnids. However, only the last six legs are used for walking while the first two are employed as sensors. In a 1999 study, the skeletal muscles of Phrynus longipes were compared against those of other chelicerates to help determine relationships. Initial results of this study displayed “New functional models for the operation of the pharyngeal and sternocoxal mechanisms in Amblypygi and a greatly expanded list of apparently unique synapomorphies supporting the monophyly of Pedipalpi”. The unique functional models highlighted by this study display unique evolutionary patterns. The morphology of these amblypygids reflects these evolutionary patterns.

Phrynus longipes, along with other arachnids, exhibits sexually dimorphic characteristics. This means that males and females have different phenotypes of certain traits. The male Phrynus longipes has longer pedipalps – the first pair of legs that is used as a sensory tool. This can serve to provide the males with advantages for hunting at night. The longer pedipalps provide advantages for sensing, locating, and chasing prey throughout the night. There are no hypothesized evolutionary advantages for smaller pedipalps.

Habitat and distribution

Distribution 
Phrynus longipes are found in most tropical and subtropical climates across the world. They have a preference for the warm and wet climate and a strong distaste for cold and freezing temperatures. Phrynus longipes are typically found in the forests of Central America and the northernmost point of South America.

Habitat 
They have been found in an array of habitats within tropical or subtropical climates. From forests to caves, Phrynus longipes can live in a wide variety of homes. Different homes (such as caves, trees, and shrubs) provide different evolutionary advantages and disadvantages. Despite their ability and willingness to live in a wide variety of homes, Phrynus longipes has been shown to prefer to live near or in massive tree stumps. It is believed this is the case as most of the prey for this specific species also tends to gather around large tree stumps.

Diet
Phrynus longipes are nocturnal predators meaning they use the disguise of darkness to hunt and ambush their prey. Using their first pair of legs as sensors, they are able to detect a wide array of prey.  

Phrynus longipes feed on a variety of invertebrates as their primary source of food. However, these are one of the only species of amblypygid that have been recorded eating small vertebrates. One Phrynus longipes was recorded feeding on a hummingbird in the British Virgin Islands. This specific example was the first ever recorded instance of a bird being preyed upon by an amblypygid.

Mating and reproduction 
The length of a sexual interaction between Phrynus longipes varies - it can be as short as one hour but as long as eight hours. They mate via indirect sperm transfer utilizing a scelrotizied spermatophore. Pre-mating behavior is highly conserved and oftentimes performed by the male as he tries to court the female. These behaviors include jerking motions and pedipalp movements. Following these interactions, the spermatophore will be deposited into the female - ultimately resulting in fertilization and the development of an egg sac.

Polygyny is the most common mating pattern amongst Phrynus longipes as the males are free to mate with many females. The females, due to their caring for the egg sac, are prohibited from mating freely with multiple males. In the cases where polygyny does not occur, Phrynus longipes has been observed to take part in mate-multiply behavior. This means that one male will mate multiple times with the same female in order to ensure full paternal-ship of every clutch. This type of monogamous mating better ensures that the male will have plentiful offspring of his own.

Social behavior 
Phrynus longipes have not been observed displaying prosocial behaviors. Rather, the majority of their social behavior comes in the form of agonistic interactions over territory. They have been shown to choose around half of a square meter of land and protect it. Aside from this behavior, they exhibit minimal protective behavior and social interaction. 

Phrynus longipes exhibits defense mechanisms for their territory. These behaviors are often highly conserved and can often follow unique patterns of repeated behaviors. Further, competition among Phrynus longipes is a common occurrence.   

They often initiate disputes with a series of pedipalp movements. If the dispute is not resolved then physical violence ensues. Some fights end with the two opponents walking away unscathed, while others result in the loser being consumed by the winner.

Predators 
Phrynus longipes tend to be the dominant predator in their ecosystem. Most prevalent in certain cave systems, they are at the top of the food chain. This means that they are often protected from outside predation. Further, in the caves, Phrynus longipes have the ability to quickly and discreetly hide in nooks and crannies if they are to encounter a predator.

In territorial battles, Phrynus longipes have been shown to kill and eat each other. If Phrynus longipes leave the cave system, they face predation from certain avian species and other small vertebrates. The long upper limbs of Phrynus longipes, while serving as all important sensors, make them easily detectable to a predator.

Interactions with humans and livestock 
Due to their affinity for tropical and subtropical habitats, Phrynus longipes very rarely interact with humans or livestock. They keep to themselves for the most part, as they try their best to defend their territory. Perhaps the most common times they and humans interact is when people explore the cave systems in Central America. They are not dangerous at all to humans. Their bites are reserved solely for territory battles or consuming prey.  

Phrynus longipes produce no venom at all. They are not often kept as pets due to their massive size and preference for a tropical climate.

Conservation 
Phrynus longipes are not considered to be an endangered species. Their population numbers are vast and they can be found in many locations given the right climate. Their habitat is often threatened by deforestation and pollution. Many live either in caves or in the nooks and crannies of a tree.  

If deforestation continues at a rapid pace, they will eventually lose a large part of their habitat. Further, human traffic and pollution can endanger the ecosystem and well being of the caves they live in. Despite the threats to their environment, they are abundant in numbers and are not in any need of conservation efforts. 

Phrynus longipes help to keep the level and numbers of invertebrates in check. Due to their size, they tend to eat more than the average arthropod. An over-abundance of Phrynus longipes threatens the livelihood of such species as worms and snails. While this is not an immediate issue, an abundance of these arachnids might cause a shift in the ecosystems of their habitats.

References

Amblypygi
Arachnids of North America
Animals described in 1894
Cave arachnids